"The Panther" (subtitled: "In Jardin des Plantes, Paris") is a poem by Rainer Maria Rilke written between 1902 and 1903. It describes a captured panther behind bars, as it was exhibited in the Ménagerie of the Jardin des Plantes in Paris. It is one of Rilke's most famous poems and has been translated into English many times, including by many distinguished translators of Rilke, like Stephen Mitchell, C. F. MacIntyre, J. B. Leishman and Walter Arndt, Jessie Lamont and poets like Robert Bly. It is used in the film Awakenings (1990) by the protagonist Leonard Lowe as a metaphor for his physical disability.

Content
The poem consists of three stanzas (strophes), each containing four verses with alternating feminine and masculine cadence:

German
Sein Blick ist vom Vorübergehn der Stäbe
so müd geworden, daß er nichts mehr hält.
Ihm ist, als ob es tausend Stäbe gäbe
und hinter tausend Stäben keine Welt.

Der weiche Gang geschmeidig starker Schritte,
der sich im allerkleinsten Kreise dreht,
ist wie ein Tanz von Kraft um eine Mitte,
in der betäubt ein großer Wille steht.

Nur manchmal schiebt der Vorhang der Pupille
sich lautlos auf –. Dann geht ein Bild hinein,
geht durch der Glieder angespannte Stille –
und hört im Herzen auf zu sein.

English
His gaze against the sweeping of the bars
has grown so weary, it can hold no more.
To him, there seem to be a thousand bars
and back behind those thousand bars no world.

The soft the supple step and sturdy pace,
that in the smallest of all circles turns,
moves like a dance of strength around a core
in which a mighty will is standing stunned.

Only at times the pupil’s curtain slides
up soundlessly — . An image enters then,
goes through the tensioned stillness of the limbs —
and in the heart ceases to be.

- English translation by Stanley Appelbaum

English
His vision, from the constantly passing bars,
has grown so weary that it cannot hold
anything else. It seems to him there are
a thousand bars; and behind the bars, no world.

As he paces in cramped circles, over and over,
the movement of his powerful soft strides
is like a ritual dance around a center
in which a mighty will stands paralyzed.

Only at times, the curtain of the pupils
lifts, quietly--. An image enters in,
rushes down through the tensed, arrested muscles,
plunges into the heart and is gone.

- English translation by Stephen Mitchell

English
His gaze has, from the passing of the bars,
grown so weary that it cannot hold.
To him, there seem to be thousand bars
and behind those thousand bars no world.

The smooth pace, the strong and supple stride,
that circles in the smallest space,
is like a dance of force around a middle,
in which a strong will’s paralysed.

Only at times the pupil’s veil
lifts without a sound –. An image enters,
moving through the body's rigid hush-
and in the heart ceases to be.

- English translation by A.F.

Further reading 
 Hans Kügler: Rainer Maria Rilke. Der Panther. In: Karl Hotz (Hrsg.): Gedichte aus sieben Jahrhunderten. Interpretationen. Buchner, Bamberg 1987, p. 211 German)
 Manfred Back: „Das Anschauen ist eine so wunderbare Sache …“. Rilkes Panther nach dem Sprung ins Dinggedicht. In: Ingo Wintermeyer (Hrsg.): Kleine Lauben, Arcadien und Schnabelewopski. Festschrift für Klaus Jeziorkowski. Königshausen und Neumann, Würzburg 1995, pp. 123–131 (excerpt at Google books, German).
 Erich Unglaub: Panther und Aschanti. Rilke-Gedichte in kulturwissenschaftlicher Sicht. Lang, Frankfurt am Main u. a. 2005,  (German)
 Lawrence Ryan: Neue Gedichte - New Poems. In: Erika Alma Metzger (ed.), Michael M. Metzger (ed.): A Companion to the Works of Rainer Maria Rilke. Boydell & Brewer, 2001, pp. 128-153

References

External links
 

Poetry by Rainer Maria Rilke
Austrian poems
1902 poems